Rue de Ménilmontant is a street which runs through the 20e arrondissement of Paris, France.

History 

In 1732 the street was altered to be less steep, in 1733 it was made wider and in 1734, by order of the King, trees were planted on both sides. From 1777 to 1806 it was separated in three parts. The first part between rue de la Folie-Méricourt and rue Popincourt was called , the second part ending  was called , the third and last part was called . Since 1806 the whole length has been entirely known as rue de Ménilmontant. In 1860 Baron Haussmann integrate the village of Ménilmontant into Paris, making rue de Ménilmontant a street of Paris.

Name origin 
The word  (from the latin ) meant country house and was also sometimes used to designate a hamlet. The name later became  then  and finally , probably due to the steepness of the street ( meaning climbing).

Closest transport 
Metro: Ménilmontant (Paris Métro); Saint-Fargeau (Paris Métro)

Bus: 26;60;61;96

References

Rue de Ménilmontant